Dundalk Football Club is a professional association football club in Dundalk, Ireland. Dundalk compete in the League of Ireland Premier Division—the top tier of football in the Republic of Ireland—and are the highest-ranked Irish side in European football as measured by UEFA club coefficients. They are the second most successful club in the League's history (with 14 league titles and 12 FAI Cups), and the most successful in the Premier Division era.

The table details the team's achievements in senior first-team competitions. As of the end of the 2022 season, the team has spent 100 seasons in senior football – four seasons in the Leinster Senior League, 87 seasons in the League of Ireland/Premier Division, and nine seasons in the League of Ireland First Division (the second tier).

History

League seasons
Sources

a. Includes the Dublin City Cup, Top Four Cup, Leinster Senior Cup, Dublin and Belfast Intercity Cup, Setanta Sports Cup, Champions Cup (All-Ireland), President of Ireland's Cup, and LFA President's Cup.

Key

P = Played
W = Games won
D = Games drawn
L = Games lost
F = Goals for
A = Goals against
Pts = Points
Pos = Final position

Prem = League of Ireland Premier Division
First = League of Ireland First Division
LOI = League of Ireland pre 1985–86
LSL = Leinster Senior League
DNQ = Did not qualify
PR = Preliminary Round
1Q = 1st Qualifying Round
2Q = 2nd Qualifying Round

3Q = 3rd Qualifying Round
PO = Play-off Round
Grp = Group Stage
R1 = Round 1
R2 = Round 2
R3 = Round 3
R4 = Round 4
R5 = Round 5

L16 = Round of 16
QF = Quarter-finals
SF = Semi-finals
R/U = Runners Up
W = Winners

Footnotes

References
Bibliography

Citations

Dundalk F.C.